Charles Eugene Thompson Jr. was a college football player and high school football coach.

Early years
Thompson attended Boys High School.

College football
Charlie Thompson was an All-Southern end for the Georgia Bulldogs of the University of Georgia, switching to that position from the backfield. He was elected captain in 1916, but was ruled ineligible. Smack Thompson was his brother.

Thompson starred in an all-star game in Savannah on Christmas Day. One account reads "On an intended forward pass Thompson made a run of thirty-five yards around left end with no interference for a touchdown. He missed goal."

High school football
Thompson coached football for the old Tech High School 'Smithies' in Atlanta.

References

Georgia Bulldogs football players
All-Southern college football players
American football ends
Players of American football from Atlanta
1894 births
1949 deaths